Herman I was Lord of Lippe from 1158 through 1167.

Lords of Lippe
12th-century German nobility
Year of birth missing
Year of death missing